Josma Selim (born Hedwig Josma Fischer; 5 June 1884 – 25 August 1929) was an Austrian singer. She appeared in cabaret, and toured Europe giving performances accompanied on the piano by her husband Ralph Benatzky.

Life
Selim was born in Vienna in 1884. She soon became a well known singer.

She married in 1914 the composer Ralph Benatzky. He wrote about 500 songs for her, and accompanied her on the piano; together they toured Germany, Switzerland, Italy and England. Her style of presentation was based on cabaret in Munich (in particular the venue ) and in Vienna.

In 1921 Selim and Benatzky performed to great acclaim at the Deutsches Theater in Berlin, and from that time the city became important in their work. From 1924 they lived in Berlin, where they made recordings of their songs.

Selim died in Berlin in 1929.

References

1884 births
1929 deaths
Musicians from Vienna
Austrian cabaret performers
20th-century Austrian women singers